Chaim Halberstam of Sanz (1793–1876), known as the Divrei Chaim after the title of his writings, was the rabbi of Sanz, and the founding rebbe of the Sanz dynasty of  hasidic Judaism.

Life 
Halberstam was a pupil of Rabbi Sholom Rokeach of Belz, Rabbi Moshe Yehoshua Heshl Orenstein and Rabbi Naftali Zvi of Ropshitz. His first rabbinical position was in Rudnik. In 1830 he was appointed as the town rabbi of Sanz, where he founded a Hasidic dynasty. He attracted many followers and students, due to his piety and greatness. Sanz has been succeeded nowadays by the Sanz-Klausenberg, Sanz-Zmigrad, Tshakover (Chokover) Hasidic dynasties,  and the Bobov Hasidic dynasties, among others.

Family life 
Halberstam was born in 1793, in Tarnogród, today Poland. His first wife Rochel Feyga was the daughter of Rabbi Boruch Frenkl-Thumim (1760–1828), the rabbi of Lipník nad Bečvou ( Leipnik) and author of the work Boruch Taam. She bore him five sons and three daughters. When she died he then married her sister, who died childless. His third wife was Rechil Devorah Unger, daughter of Rabbi Yechil Tzvi Unger, son of Rabbi Mordechai Dovid Unger of Dombrov; who bore him three sons and four daughters.

Halberstam had eight sons and seven daughters. His eight sons were:

Rabbi Yechezkel Shraga Halberstam (1814–1898) of Shinove
Rabbi Dovid Halberstam (1821–1894) of Chrzanów
Rabbi Myer Noson Halberstam (1827–1855), father of Rabbi Shlomo Halberstam, the first Bobover Rebbe
Rabbi Aharon Halberstam (1828-1903) his successor in Nowy Sącz
Rabbi Boruch Halberstam (1829–1906) of Gorlice
Rabbi Shulem Lazer Halberstam of Ratzfert (1861–1944), who was murdered by the Nazis in the Holocaust
Rabbi Yeshaye Halberstam of Czchów (Yiddish: טשחויוו Tshkhoiv) (1864–1944), who was also murdered by the Nazis.
Aryeh Leibish Halberstam died at age of 7

Halberstam's sons all became famous rebbes (except for Myer Noson, who predeceased him). His seven daughters all married Hasidic leaders.

Halberstam died in Sanz, Austria-Hungary (now Poland) in 1876 (25 Nisan 5636).

Leadership 
Halberstam  was acclaimed by the leading rabbis of his generation as one of the foremost Talmudists, poskim and Kabbalistic authorities of his time, he received queries from Rabbis and communities from all over the world. His responsa, as well as his Torah commentaries, published under the title Divrei Chaim, reflect his Torah greatness, his humility, and his compassionate nature. He was a champion of the poor and established many organizations to relieve them of their poverty. He was the first Honorary President of Kolel Chibas Yerushalayim. His compassion and generosity was legendary; he literally gave away everything he had for the needy; and went to sleep penniless.

During his 46 years as Rabbi of Sanz; that city was transformed into a vibrant center of Hasidism, attracting tens of thousands of followers. Among his many disciples, are counted such leaders as Rabbi Zvi Hirsh Friedlander of Liska, the Tiferes Shlome of Radomsk, Rabbi Abraham Judah ha-Kohen Schwartz, Rabbi Meir Horowitz of Dzhikov, and the Kedishes Yom Tov of Sighet. He studied with his brother-in-law, Yosef Babad, author of the Minchat Chinuch.

References 

1793 births
1876 deaths
Sanz (Hasidic dynasty)
Orthodox rabbis from Galicia (Eastern Europe)
Polish Hasidic rabbis
Hasidic rabbis in Europe